Jeffrey William Van Gundy (born January 19, 1962) is an American commentator for ESPN and former basketball coach. He served as head coach of the New York Knicks and the Houston Rockets of the National Basketball Association (NBA). During his tenure on the Knicks, he led the team to the 1999 NBA Finals, where they ultimately lost to the San Antonio Spurs.

Early life
Van Gundy was born in Hemet, California, and grew up in the town of Martinez, California. He is the son of a basketball coach, Bill Van Gundy, the former head coach at SUNY Brockport and at Genesee Community College. Jeff's elder brother, Stan, later became head coach of the NBA's Miami Heat, Orlando Magic, and the New Orleans Pelicans, and is the former head coach and director of basketball operations for the Detroit Pistons.

As a high-school point guard, Van Gundy was a two-time All Greater Rochester selection in 1979 and 1980, leading Brockport Central to the Class AA finals. He continued his basketball playing career at Nazareth College, where he earned All-American honors, while leading the Golden Flyers to an NCAA Division III Tournament berth in 1984. He remains the Nazareth career leader in free throw percentage, at 86.8%.

Van Gundy attended Yale University, where he was a classmate with Jodie Foster, before transferring to Menlo College, and ultimately graduating from New York's Nazareth College, in 1985.

Coaching career

Early career
Van Gundy began his basketball coaching career during the 1985–86 season, at McQuaid Jesuit High School, in Rochester, New York. The following year, he became a graduate assistant under head coach Rick Pitino, at Providence College, helping the Providence Friars advance to the Final Four. In his second season with the Friars, he was promoted to assistant coach under Gordon Chiesa. The next season, Van Gundy became an assistant coach under Bob Wenzel, at Rutgers.

New York Knicks
On July 28, 1989, Van Gundy became an assistant coach for the New York Knicks. He spent the next six-and-a-half seasons providing support to Knicks head coaches Stu Jackson (1989–1990), John MacLeod (1990–1991), Pat Riley (1991–1995), and Don Nelson (1995–1996). During his tenure as an assistant coach, the Knicks won three Atlantic Division titles, never finished lower than third in the division, and qualified for the playoffs every year. The Knicks advanced to the Eastern Conference Finals in 1993, and the NBA Finals versus the Houston Rockets in 1994.

On March 8, 1996, Van Gundy was named head coach of the New York Knicks, taking over the reins from Don Nelson. In his second game as head coach, he notably led the Knicks to a 32–point blowout win over the Michael Jordan-led Chicago Bulls, who had eliminated the Knicks from the playoffs four times since 1989. However, Van Gundy was unable to change that trend in the postseason, as the Knicks fell to Chicago in the conference semifinals.

In his first full season as head coach, the Knicks tied for the third-best record in franchise history, at 57–25. In the regular season finale, the Knicks defeated the 69–12 Chicago Bulls in Chicago, preventing them from posting two consecutive 70-win seasons in a row, and tying the best home record in NBA history. Van Gundy created a memorable scene in the 1998 NBA Playoffs series between the New York Knicks and the Miami Heat. When the Heat's 6'10" (2.08 m), 240 lb. (109 kg) center Alonzo Mourning, and the Knicks' 6'7" (2.01 m), 250 lb. (113 kg) power forward Larry Johnson, engaged in a bench-clearing brawl, Van Gundy unsuccessfully tried to break the fight up. Most memorably, the 5'9" (1.75 m), 165 lb. (75 kg) Van Gundy fell to the floor, and clung to Mourning's leg. Suspensions were handed down for the brawl, but the Knicks held on to win the series 3-2 and moved on to play the Indiana Pacers in the Eastern Conference semi-finals.

In the lockout–shortened 1998–99 season, the Knicks struggled with injuries (namely to all-star Patrick Ewing) and finished 27–23 to finish as the eighth seed for the playoffs (they had to win six of their remaining eight games just to qualify). In the first round of the playoffs, the Knicks defied expectations and defeated the Heat in five games, avenging the previous season's playoff loss and becoming just the second 8th seed to defeat the number one seed in the playoffs. The win propelled an improbable run for the Knicks, as they swept the Hawks in the semifinals, and defeated the Pacers in six games, to advance to the NBA Finals. Without Ewing, they were no match in the Finals against the Spurs, and lost the series in five games. The Knicks were the first eighth-seeded team in NBA history to reach the NBA Finals.

The Knicks followed up their Finals run with a 50–32 season, and advanced to the Conference Finals, where they were defeated by the Indiana Pacers. Until the 2013 playoffs, this was the last time the Knicks won a playoff series.

In a 2001 game between the Spurs and Knicks, Danny Ferry elbowed Marcus Camby. While talking to the referee, Camby lost control and tried to punch Ferry. Camby missed and hit Van Gundy instead, who said he learned his lesson about trying to break up fights between players. The Knicks finished 48–34, but lost in the first round to the Raptors.

Just 19 games into the 2001–02 season, Van Gundy resigned from the Knicks' head coach position. The move was unexpected, as the Knicks were on a winning streak, and coming off a 14–point victory against the Milwaukee Bucks.

Houston Rockets
On June 10, 2003, Van Gundy was named head coach of the Houston Rockets, replacing Rudy Tomjanovich. In his first season as the team's head coach, the Rockets finished with a 45–37 record, and qualified for the playoffs for the first time in five years, but they were eliminated in the first round of the playoffs by the Los Angeles Lakers.

In his second season with the Rockets, Van Gundy guided the team, led by the Yao Ming / Tracy McGrady duo, to a 51–31 record, which was their first season with more than 50 wins in eight years. The Rockets once again lost in the first round of the playoffs, this time to the Dallas Mavericks.

McGrady and Yao missed a combined 70 games due to injury in the 2005–06 season, and Van Gundy did not make the playoffs for the first time in his NBA head coaching career. In May 2005, Van Gundy was fined $100,000 by the NBA, for accusing referees of targeting Houston Rockets center Yao Ming. Van Gundy blamed Dallas Mavericks owner Mark Cuban for causing the referees' alleged bias. This is the largest fine handed down to a coach in NBA history.

The injuries and disappointments continued for the Rockets into the following season, with injuries limiting Yao to just 48 games played, and McGrady also not fully recovered from his injuries. The Rockets went on a late season run, on the back of a resurgence from McGrady, but another first round playoff loss, this time to the Utah Jazz, sealed Van Gundy's fate as the team's head coach. At the conclusion of their decisive Game 7 loss in the first round of the playoffs, Van Gundy was fired, and then replaced by Rick Adelman.

National team career
In July 2017, it was announced that Van Gundy would be the head coach of the senior United States men's national basketball team at the 2017 FIBA AmeriCup tournament, and in the qualifiers for the 2019 FIBA World Cup in China. USA head coach Gregg Popovich would then resume coaching the team at the World Cup, and at the 2020 Summer Olympics, should they qualify for either. Team USA became Van Gundy's first coaching job since leaving the Rockets in 2007.

Van Gundy went on to guide the US to the gold medal at the 2017 FIBA AmeriCup, and also to qualify for the 2019 FIBA World Cup.

Broadcasting career
Following his firing from the Houston Rockets in 2007, Van Gundy was a guest analyst for ESPN's broadcast of the Phoenix Suns-San Antonio Spurs game in San Antonio, Texas, and he has since been a regular broadcast member for ESPN. He now calls games as a color commentator with play-by-play announcer Mike Breen and Mark Jackson, including the NBA Finals.

Life outside basketball
Jeff Van Gundy was an executive board member of Pro-Vision Academy, a charter school and non-profit organization in Houston, that provides educational, job-training, and mentoring services to boys and girls aged 10–18.

Van Gundy's older brother is Stan Van Gundy.

On May 8, 2011, Van Gundy received an honorary degree of Doctor of Humane Letters, from his alma mater, Nazareth College, during the college's 84th Annual Commencement Ceremony.

NBA head coaching record

|- 
| style="text-align:left;"|New York
| style="text-align:left;"|
| 23||13||10|||| style="text-align:center;"|2nd in Atlantic||8||4||4||
| style="text-align:center;"|Lost in Conference Semifinals
|-
| style="text-align:left;"|New York
| style="text-align:left;"|
| 82||57||25|||| style="text-align:center;"|2nd in Atlantic||10||6||4||
| style="text-align:center;"|Lost in Conference Semifinals
|-
| style="text-align:left;"|New York
| style="text-align:left;"|
| 82||43||39|||| style="text-align:center;"|2nd in Atlantic||10||4||6||
| style="text-align:center;"|Lost in Conference Semifinals
|-
| style="text-align:left;"|New York
| style="text-align:left;"|
| 50||27||23|||| style="text-align:center;"|4th in Atlantic||20||12||8||
| style="text-align:center;"|Lost in NBA Finals
|- 
| style="text-align:left;"|New York
| style="text-align:left;"|
| 82||50||32|||| style="text-align:center;"|2nd in Atlantic||16||9||7||
| style="text-align:center;"|Lost in Conference Finals
|-
| style="text-align:left;"|New York
| style="text-align:left;"|
| 82||48||34|||| style="text-align:center;"|3rd in Atlantic||5||2||3||
| style="text-align:center;"|Lost in first round
|-
| style="text-align:left;"|New York
| style="text-align:left;"|
| 19||10||9|||| style="text-align:center;"|(resigned)||—||—||—||—
| style="text-align:center;"|—
|-
| style="text-align:left;"|Houston
| style="text-align:left;"|
| 82||45||37|||| style="text-align:center;"|5th in Midwest||5||1||4||
| style="text-align:center;"|Lost in first round
|- 
| style="text-align:left;"|Houston
| style="text-align:left;"|
| 82||51||31|||| style="text-align:center;"|3rd in Southwest||7||3||4||
| style="text-align:center;"|Lost in first round
|-
| style="text-align:left;"|Houston
| style="text-align:left;"|
| 82||34||48|||| style="text-align:center;"|5th in Southwest||—||—||—||—
| style="text-align:center;"|Missed playoffs
|-
| style="text-align:left;"|Houston
| style="text-align:left;"|
| 82||52||30|||| style="text-align:center;"|3rd in Southwest||7||3||4||
| style="text-align:center;"|Lost in first round
|- class="sortbottom"
| style="text-align:center;" colspan="2"|Career
| 748||430||318|||| ||88||44||44||||

References

External links
Jeff Van Gundy at basketballreference.com
Jeff Van Gundy at usab.com

1962 births
Living people
American color commentators
American men's basketball players
American men's basketball coaches
American people of Dutch descent
Basketball coaches from New York (state)
Basketball players from New York (state)
Brockport Golden Eagles men's basketball players
College basketball announcers in the United States
High school basketball coaches in the United States
Houston Rockets head coaches
Junior college men's basketball players in the United States 
Menlo College alumni
National Basketball Association broadcasters
Nazareth College (New York) alumni
New York Knicks assistant coaches
New York Knicks head coaches
People from Hemet, California
People from Monroe County, New York
Point guards
Providence Friars men's basketball coaches
United States men's national basketball team coaches